Brian Cooper may refer to:
 Brian Cooper (baseball) (born 1974), American baseball pitcher
 Brian Cooper (rugby league) (born 1931), English rugby league player
 Brian Cooper (sprinter) (born 1965), American sprinter
 Brian Cooper (ice hockey) (born 1999), American ice hockey player

See also 
 Bryan Cooper (disambiguation)